Samways is a surname. Notable people with the surname include:

Mark Samways (born 1968), British footballer 
Vinny Samways (born 1968), British footballer